Australia competed in the 2017 Summer Deaflympics which was held in Samsun, Turkey. Australia sent a team consisting of 28 athletes for the event. This was the 15th appearance that Australia took part at the Summer Deaflympics since making its Deaflympic debut in 1953.

References 

 Deaf Sports Australia 
 Better Hearing

External links 
 Australia at the Deaflympics

Nations at the 2017 Summer Deaflympics
Australia at the Deaflympics